Azmatabad is a village, near Rajouri City in Thanamandi tehsil in Rajouri district of the Indian union territory of Jammu and Kashmir.

Demographics
According to the 2011 census of India, Azmatabad has 298 households. The literacy rate of Azmatabad village was 64.31% compared to 67.16% of Jammu and Kashmir. In Azmatabad, Male literacy stands at 78.98% while the female literacy rate was 49.45%.

Transport

Road
Azmatabad is connected by road with other places in Jammu and Kashmir and India by the Mughal Road and NH 144A.

Rail
The nearest railway stations to Azmatabad are Anantnag railway station and Jammu Tawi railway station located at a distance of 140 and 177 kilometres respectively.

Air
The nearest airport is Srinagar International Airport located at a distance of 165 kilometres and is a 5-hour drive.

See also
Jammu and Kashmir
Rajouri
Rajouri district

References

Villages in Rajouri district